David Yanovich Cherkassky (23 August 1932 – 30 October 2018) was a Soviet and Ukrainian animated film director and screenwriter. He made several animation pictures for Kievnauchfilm.

Biography
David Cherkassky was born in 1932 in Shpola, Ukrainian SSR. Cherkassky graduated from the Kiev Construction Engineering Institute. He noted that Soviet parents anticipated that the Soviet Union will participate in war and so registered their children later to delay them to be drafted to army. Cherkassky in interview acknowledged that he was born in 23 August 1932. During World War II, he and his mother were evacuated to a village near the Russian city of Chkalov (today Orenburg).

David Cherkassky was a member of the Ukrainian gymnast team. Since he was 50, and until he was 80, Cherkassky enjoyed alpine skiing.

After the death of Stalin, Cherkassky found out that his family origin is a small city of Shpola in Central Ukraine and he has some extensive family in the United States. His father was a director of typography after the revolution and later he served as an assistant to People's Commissar of Justice.

He was married to animator and animation director Natalya Marchenkova.

Filmography

Director
 1964 Mystery of the Black King along with Sergei Lyalin
 1967 Columbus is landing on the coast
 1969 Mystery-Bouffe
 1970 Short stories
 1971 Wizard Okh
 1972 Around the World against the Will
 1974 Pharaohs, good-bye! along with Vyacheslav Vinnik
 1975 What the hell do you want?
 1979 Adventures of Captain Wrongel
 1983 Wings
 1984 Doctor Aybolit
 1988 Treasure Island
 1992 Crazy macaroni or the error of professor Bugensberg, the motion picture was not finished

References

1932 births
2018 deaths
People from Shpola
Kyiv National University of Construction and Architecture alumni
Recipients of the title of People's Artists of Ukraine
Recipients of the Order of Merit (Ukraine), 2nd class
Recipients of the Order of Merit (Ukraine), 3rd class
Kievnauchfilm
Soviet animators
Soviet Jews
Soviet screenwriters
Ukrainian animated film directors
Ukrainian animators
Ukrainian Jews
Ukrainian screenwriters